Comrade Arseny is a 1964 Soviet drama film directed by Ivan Lukinsky.

Plot 
The film tells about the beginning of the revolutionary activity of the Bolshevik Frunze.

Cast 
 Roman Khomyatov as Mikhail
 Natalya Klimova as Olga
 Vladimir Solovyov as Father
 Vladimir Zlatoustovsky as Bobrov
 Konstantin Mikhaylov as Smolin
 Vladimir Vladislavskiy

References

External links 
 

1964 films
1960s Russian-language films
Soviet drama films
1964 drama films
Films scored by Tikhon Khrennikov